Gottfried Haschke (25 March 1935 – 2 December 2018) was an East German politician. He served as the last East German Minister of Food and Agriculture in the de Maizière cabinet during 1990.

References

1935 births
2018 deaths
Members of the Bundestag for Saxony
Members of the Bundestag 1998–2002
Members of the Bundestag 1994–1998
Members of the Bundestag 1990–1994
Parliamentary State Secretaries of Germany
Members of the Bundestag for the Christian Democratic Union of Germany